2nd Maldives Film Awards ceremony, presented by the Maldives Film Association, honored the best Maldivian films released in 2010 and 2011. Nominations for the major categories were announced on 25 June 2012. The ceremony was held on 4 July 2012.

Feature film

Short film

Special awards

Most wins
Loodhifa - 6
Niuma - 5

See also
 Maldives Film Awards

References

Maldives Film Awards
2012 film awards
2012 in the Maldives
November 2012 events in Asia